Maria ("Mia") Francisca Philomena Hoogakker-Gommers (born 26 September 1939) is a retired Dutch athlete, who competed mainly in the 800 metres. She was the second female world record-holder over 1500 metres in October 1967 at Sittard (The Netherlands), breaking the record of Anne Smith, who set the record in June of that year, by almost two seconds.

Gommers competed for The Netherlands in the 1968 Olympics held in Mexico City, Mexico in the 800 metres, where she won the bronze medal.

On 14 June 1969 she also broke Smith's world record on the mile in an event in Leicester. At the 1969 European Championships in Athletics in Athens on 20 September 1969, she ran below Paola Pigni's new 1500 m record, but was beaten to the finish by Jaroslava Jehlickova. In 1969 she was chosen the Dutch female sportsperson of the year.

References

1939 births
Living people
Athletes (track and field) at the 1968 Summer Olympics
Dutch female middle-distance runners
European Athletics Championships medalists
World record setters in athletics (track and field)
Olympic athletes of the Netherlands
Olympic bronze medalists for the Netherlands
People from Stein, Limburg
Medalists at the 1968 Summer Olympics
Olympic bronze medalists in athletics (track and field)
Sportspeople from Limburg (Netherlands)
20th-century Dutch women